Olivier Rosset (born July 14, 1971) is a French music entrepreneur, founder of Chronowax and co-founder of Official.fm
He also worked for V2 Music Group as A&R and general manager.
In his early years, Rosset was also a professional bmx rider between 1990 and 1993.

Origins 
Rosset was born and raised in France in a strong musical environment and began BMX at the age of 10. He, eventually turned BMX pro rider in 1991 and travelled regularly to United States for contests and created strong creative connexions with American rap artists.
In the early 90s, Rosset started to promote rap shows in Switzerland for artists such as Lords of the Underground, Dj Cut Killer, Fugees, Assassin, La Cliqua, Lunatic before relocating to Paris where he started working on music production and management in collaboration with artists such as DJ Mehdi and La Cliqua.

Music

Distribution & Production 
In 1998, Rosset founded Chronowax, an innovative distribution and production company based in Paris.  Chronowax started as a key actor for the growing French rap scene. The company's roaster will later represent more than 300 labels such as SubPop, Def Jam, Secretly Canadian and Ed Banger and sold more than 30 million records between 1998 and 2005. 
In 2000, Chronowax got acquired by Richard Branson V2 Music Group. 
from 2003 to 2005, Rosset played a pivotal role at V2 Music Group as an A&R and general manager.  He signed and developed early careers of bands like TTC, The Knife, BLoc Party, Chromeo and Kourtrajmé.

Digital 
In 2010, Rosset co-founded Official.fm, an online music hosting and publishing platform including developing tools for copyright owners, media publishers, music professionals. artists such as Wiz Khalifa, Diplo, redbull, Universal or Sony. Official.fm got acquired by private investors in 2011. Prior to Official.fm, Rosset also co-founded with Jean-François Groff, Fairtilizer, an audio publishing service.

Music/Technology/Brand advisor 
Since 2011, Rosset is an active advisory board member and/or investor of innovative internet companies such as Shuffler.fm, Ubicmedia, and had been consulting for brands like Vivendi, LVMH, Warner, Nike Adidas, Vans ...

Discography 
 1995 Double Pact "Impact N°3" (EP) 
   
 1996 Ideal J "O'riginal MC's sur une mission" (Album), (Night &Day)
  
 1996 Shyheim (Wu-Tang), Loucha, Raphael "Worldwide" (12") (Arsenal-Barclay)
 
 1997 113 "truc de fou" (12") (mekslow)
 
 1999 113 "les princes de la villes/Hold up" (12") (Small)
 
 2000 113 "tonton du bled" (12") (Small)
 
 2000 Alan Braxe "running" (12") 
 
 2001 Dj cam "honeymoon" (lp) (Inflammable)
 
 2001 Def Jam back catalogue re-issues (lps) (Def Jam)
 
 2002 Mafia K-1Fry "pour ceux" (12"/Video) (Chr/Kourtrajme)
 
 2002 Bright Eyes (band) "lifted or the story..." (lp) (Saddle creek)
 
 2002 RJD2 "Deadringer" (lp) (defjux)
 
 2003 The Shins "chutes too narrow" (lp) (subpop)
 
 2003 Syd Matters "A whisper and a sigh" (lp) (3rdside-v2)
 
 2004 TTC "batards sensibles" (lp) (big dada-v2)
 
 2004 The Knife "Heartbeat" (maxi) (Rabbit-v2)
 
 2004 Didier Super "vaut mieux en rire..." (lp+videos) (v2)
 
 2004 Bloc Party "Banquet" (ep) (wichita-v2)
 
 2004 Chromeo "Needy girl" (video) (Vice-v2)
 
 2004 Chromeo "She's in control) (lp) (Vice-v2)
 
 2004 V/A "le nouveau rocknroll francais" ( lp) (chr-v2)
 
 2004 Coco rosie "la maison de mon reve" (lp) (touch&go)
 
 2004 Antony & The Johnsons "I am a bird now" (secretly Canadian)
 
 2004 V/A "le nouveau rocknroll francais" ( lp) (chr-v2)
 
 2005 Kourtrajmé "des friandises pour ta bouches" (DVD) (v2)

References 
 Sarah Perez (September 19, 2008). Fairtilizer Launches Next-Gen Music Company readwrite.com
 Chromeo (September 18, 2011). REMEMBERING DJ MEHDI
 Olivier Rosset on 23mag.com, memories of bmx

Living people
French music industry executives
French record producers
1971 births